Animals' Party (Swedish: Djurens parti; DP) is an animal rights party in Sweden, founded on February 14, 2014.

References 

2014 establishments in Sweden
Animal rights organizations
Minor political parties in Sweden